The Han twins murder conspiracy was a case of attempted murder of Sunny Han by her identical twin sister Jeena "Jeen" Han, occurring on  November 6, 1996 in Irvine, California. Both are Korean-born American citizens.

It quickly became a sensationalized story in the media. The case brought together the folkloric themes of surviving a broken family through a close sisterly bond; of rival twin sisters, one "good" and one "evil"; and of the fall from grace of a child of promise, as the immigrant Jeena Han had been with her twin her high school co-valedictorian.

Jeena Han recruited two teenage youths to capture her sister at home, but the plot went awry and the two were quickly taken into custody by local police. The jury reached their verdict as to each defendant on November 20, 1997, after ten hours' deliberation. Han was convicted of all charges including one count of conspiracy to commit murder, two counts of burglary (one in the first and another in the second degree), two counts of false imprisonment, and one count of a convicted felon in possession of a firearm. The jury also found that Han was armed with a firearm during the commission of each offense.

Jeen Han was imprisoned at the Central California Women's Facility in Chowchilla, Calif., in 1998 with a sentence of 26 years to life in prison. She was given an additional year because the jury found the firearm enhancement to be true. Twenty years later, in May 2018, she was granted parole by California's Board of Parole. Jeen received support from Sunny for parole.

Aftermath
In 1999, the case was featured in the book Evil Twins by John Glatt.

In November 1999, an American Justice documentary titled "Sister Against Sister: The Twin Murder Plot" aired on A&E, covering the sensational details of the case.  The program was hosted by Bill Kurtis.

In 2001, the case was profiled on The Investigators under the title "Evil Twin".

In 2005, Snapped, a series about true crime on the Oxygen Network, ran an episode about Jeen's plot to kill her twin sister and take over her life.

In 2012, this story became the focus of the pilot episode of the Investigation Discovery show, "Evil Twins".

References

External links
"Family feud leads to twin's murder plot." Associated Press at Beloit Daily News. Monday November 18, 1996.
"'Evil twin' found guilty of plotting to kill sister." Associated Press at Beloit Daily News. Friday November 21, 1997.
Court of Appeal verdict The People v. Jeen Young Han et al. 2/25/00
"JAILED SUSPECT SAYS TWIN SISTER LIED ABOUT MURDER PLOT." Associated Press at the Los Angeles Daily News. November 18, 1996.
Snapped - Jeena Han
"Evil Twins" true crime paperback - Amazon.com
Hernandez, Greg. "Woman Gets 26 Years to Life in Plot to Kill Identical Twin." Los Angeles Times. May 9, 1998. 
Hernandez, Greg. "Twin Gets 26 Years to Life for Murder Plot." Los Angeles Times. May 9, 1998.
"Woman Jailed 26 Years to Life." The New York Times. May 10, 1998.
Orange County Register - Evil Twin Murder Plot
‘Evil twin’ granted parole after serving nearly 2 decades in prison for plot to kill sister in Irvine 

American people convicted of attempted murder
American people of Korean descent
Crimes in California
Attempt
Conspiracy (criminal)
1974 births
Living people